Connor Vest (born 26 April 1994) is an Australian rugby union player who plays for the  in Super Rugby. His playing position is lock. He was named in the Reds squad for Round 4 of the 2022 Super Rugby Pacific season.

Reference list

External links
itsrugby.co.uk profile

Australian rugby union players
Living people
Rugby union locks
Sydney (NRC team) players
New South Wales Country Eagles players
Queensland Reds players
1994 births
Auckland rugby union players